Villa Faraldi is a comune (municipality) in the Province of Imperia in the Italian region Liguria, located about  southwest of Genoa and about  northeast of Imperia.

Villa Faraldi borders the following municipalities: Andora, Diano San Pietro, San Bartolomeo al Mare, and Stellanello.

Demographic evolution

See also 
 Steria

References

External links
 Tourist information about Villa Faraldi and surrounding (in English)

Cities and towns in Liguria